Acanthocephalus anguillae is a species of parasitic worm in the phylum Acanthocephala.  An intestinal parasite, it is found both in the Baltic Sea and along the coast of California, where it is often found in the fore- and mid-gut of the Brown and Rainbow trouts.


References

Notes

Further reading

External links

Echinorhynchidae
Animals described in 1780
Fauna of California
Fauna of the Baltic Sea